Are You Serious may refer to:

Music

Albums
 Are You Serious? (Dead to Fall album)
 Are You Serious? (Richard Pryor album) 1976 nominated for Grammy Award for Best Comedy Album
 Are You Serious (Andrew Bird album) 2016

Songs
 "Are You Serious" by Tyrone Davis Composed by Leo Graham
 "Are You Serious" by 'Til Tuesday Composed by Aimee Mann / Joey Pesce / Michael Hausman / Robert Holmes
 "Are You Serious", a song in Filthy Frank album Pink Season (Pink Guy Album)